The 2018 All-Big 12 Conference football team consists of American football players chosen as All-Big 12 Conference players for the 2018 Big 12 Conference football season.  The conference recognizes two official All-Big 12 selectors: (1) the Big 12 conference coaches selected separate offensive and defensive units and named first- and second-team players (the "Coaches" team); and (2) a panel of sports writers and broadcasters covering the Big 12 also selected offensive and defensive units and named first- and second-team players (the "Media" team).

Offensive selections

Quarterbacks

 Kyler Murray, Oklahoma (Coaches-1; Media-1)
 Will Grier, West Virginia (Coaches-2; Media-2)

Running backs

 Alex Barnes, Kansas State (Coaches-2; Media-1)
 Justice Hill, Oklahoma State (Coaches-1; Media-2)
 David Montgomery, Iowa State (Coaches-2; Media-1)
 Pooka Williams Jr., Kansas (Coaches-1; Media-2)

Fullbacks

 Andrew Beck, Texas (Coaches-1)
 Carson Meier, Oklahoma (Coaches-2)

Centers

 Zach Shackelford, Texas (Coaches-2; Media-1)
 Creed Humphrey, Oklahoma (Media-2)

Guards
 Ben Powers, Oklahoma (Coaches-1; Media-1)
 Dru Samia, Oklahoma (Coaches-1; Media-1)
 Jack Anderson, Texas Tech (Coaches-2; Media-2)
 Josh Sills, West Virginia (Coaches-2; Media-2)

Tackles

 Yodny Cajuste, West Virginia (Coaches-1; Media-1)
 Dalton Risner, Kansas State (Coaches-1; Media-1)
 Bobby Evans, Oklahoma (Coaches-1; Media-2)
 Cody Ford, Oklahoma (Coaches-2; Media-2)
 Hakeem Adeniji, Kansas (Coaches-2)

Tight ends

 Grant Calcaterra, Oklahoma (Coaches-1; Media-1)
 Trevon Wesco, West Virginia (Coaches-1; Media-2)
 Charlie Kolar, Iowa State (Coaches-2)

Receivers

 Marquise Brown, Oklahoma (Coaches-1; Media-1)
 Tylan Wallace, Oklahoma State (Coaches-1; Media-1)
 David Sills, West Virginia (Coaches-1; Media-2)
 Antoine Wesley, Texas Tech (Coaches-2; Media-1)
 Hakeem Butler, Iowa State (Coaches-2; Media-2)
 Jalen Reagor, TCU (Coaches-2)

Defensive selections

Defensive linemen
 Ben Banogu, TCU (Coaches-1; Media-1)
 Charles Omenihu, Texas (Coaches-1; Media-1)
 Daniel Wise, Kansas (Coaches-1; Media-1)
 Jordan Brailford, Oklahoma State (Coaches-1; Media-2)
 L. J. Collier, TCU (Coaches-1; Media-2)
 James Lynch, Baylor (Coaches-2; Media-1)
 Kenny Bigelow Jr., West Virginia (Coaches-2; Media-2)
 Ray Lima, Iowa State (Coaches-2; Media-2)
 JaQuan Bailey, Iowa State (Coaches-2)
 Jarrell Owens, Oklahoma State (Coaches-2)

Linebackers

 Dakota Allen, Texas Tech (Coaches-1; Media-1)
 Joe Dineen Jr., Kansas (Coaches-1; Media-1)
 David Long Jr., West Virginia (Coaches-1; Media-1)
 Gary Johnson, Texas (Coaches-2; Media-2)
 Clay Johnston, Baylor (Coaches-2; Media-2)
 Kenneth Murray, Oklahoma (Coaches-2; Media-2)

Defensive backs

 Kris Boyd, Texas (Coaches-1; Media-1)
 Adrian Frye, Texas Tech (Coaches-1; Media-1)
 Kenny Robinson, West Virginia (Coaches-1; Media-1)
 Caden Sterns, Texas (Coaches-1; Media-1)
 Greg Eisworth, Iowa State (Coaches-1; Media-2)
 Jeff Gladney, TCU (Coaches-2; Media-2)
 Brian Peavy, Iowa State (Coaches-2; Media-2)
 Ridwan Issahaku, TCU (Coaches-2; Media-2)
 Duke Shelley, Kansas State (Coaches-2)
 A. J. Green, Oklahoma State (Coaches-2)

Special teams

Kickers

 Austin Seibert, Oklahoma (Coaches-1; Media-1)
 Clayton Hatfield, Texas Tech (Coaches-1; Media-2)
 Cameron Dicker, Texas (Coaches-2)

Punters

 Drew Galitz, Baylor (Coaches-1; Media-1)
 Kyle Thompson, Kansas (Coaches-2; Media-2)

All-purpose / Return specialists

 Pooka Williams, Jr., Kansas (Coaches-1; Media-1)
 Tre Brown, Oklahoma (Coaches-2)
 CeeDee Lamb, Oklahoma (Media-2)
 Kene Nwangwu, Iowa State (Coaches-2)

Key
Bold = selected as a first-team player by both the coaches and media panel

Coaches = selected by Big 12 Conference coaches

Media = selected by a media panel

See also
2018 College Football All-America Team

References

All-Big 12 Conference
All-Big 12 Conference football teams